Phước is a common gender-neutral name originating from Vietnam. It means "blessing" or "lucky". Notable people with this name include:

Given name
Lưu Hữu Phước (1921-89), Vietnamese composer
Lê Văn Phước (b. 1929), Vietnamese Olympic cyclist
Ho Henh Phươc (b. 1940), Vietnamese Olympic athlete
Hoàng Quý Phước (b. 1993), Vietnamese swimmer

Middle name
Nguyễn Phước Vĩnh Lộc (1923-2009), Vietnamese general
Châu Phước Vĩnh (b. 1927), Vietnamese Olympic cyclist
Crown Prince Nguyễn Phước Bảo Long (1934–2007)
Lê Phước Tứ (b. 1984), Vietnamese footballer
Châu Lê Phước Vĩnh (b. 1985), Vietnamese footballer 
Phạm Phước Hưng (b. 1988), Vietnamese Olympic gymnast
Trần Phước Thọ (1993–2016), Vietnamese footballer

Vietnamese names
Given names